Wafra is the southernmost area in Kuwait, within the boundaries of the former Saudi–Kuwaiti neutral zone. It is part of Ahmadi Governorate, and is well known for its fertile soil and farms. It is parallel with the Kuwait–Saudi Arabia border. Wafra and Abdali to the north are the only two cities in Kuwait known for farming and the livestock. Farms in Wafra are fed by groundwater. The farms have a very original cone-shaped mud dovecotes with hundreds of birds. People tend to visit the Wafra Market to buy fresh vegetables.

Products 
Honey
Palm trees, then grown in other cities and towns in Kuwait
Dates
Cucumbers
Lettuces
Tomatoes
Green Peppers
Crude Oil

Maps and images 

Populated places in Kuwait
Agriculture in Asia